is a district located in Fukuoka Prefecture, Japan.

According to 2005 Japanese Census data, the district has a population of 97,537 and a density of 1,045.73 persons per km2. The total area is 93.10 km2.

Towns currently in this district
Ashiya-machi（芦屋町）
Mizumaki-machi（水巻町）
Okagaki-machi（岡垣町）
Onga-chō（遠賀町）
The word roots "machi" and "chō" (both written as 町) mean "town." Onga is the only town in Fukuoka Prefecture for which 町 is pronounced "chō." For all other towns it is pronounced "machi."

Towns and Villages formerly in this district
Katsuki（香月町）- Merged to Yahata City (八幡市. described below) in 1955, currently Yahata Nishi-ku, Kitakyūshū（北九州市八幡西区）
Kōjaku Village（上津役村）- Merged to Yahata City in 1937, currently Yahata Nishi-ku, Kitakyūshū
Kurosaki（黒崎町）- Merged to Yahata City in 1926, currently Yahata Nishi-ku, Kitakyūshū
Nakama（中間町）- Upgraded to City（中間市）status in 1958
Orio（折尾町）- Merged to Yahata City in 1944, currently Yahata Nishi-ku, Kitakyūshū
Tobata（戸畑町）- Upgraded to City status in 1924, currently Tobata-ku, Kitakyūshū（北九州市戸畑区） 
Wakamatsu（若松町）- Upgraded to City status in 1914, currently Wakamatsu-ku, Kitakyūshū（北九州市若松区）
Yahata（八幡町）- Upgraded to City（八幡市）status in 1917, currently Yahata Higashi-ku, Kitakyūshū（北九州市八幡東区）

Districts in Fukuoka Prefecture